Studiomaster is a British manufacturer of mixing consoles, power amplifiers, speaker cabinets and other professional audio equipment. Studiomaster was established in the 1970s and the brand name is now under the umbrella of Studioking Limited based in the UK.

External links 
 Official website

Loudspeaker manufacturers
Audio amplifier manufacturers
Audio mixing console manufacturers
Audio equipment manufacturers of the United Kingdom